Group A of the 2013 Fed Cup Europe/Africa Zone Group II was one of two pools in the Europe/Africa zone of the 2013 Fed Cup. Four teams competed in a round-robin competition, with the top team and the bottom team proceeding to their respective sections of the play-offs: the top team played for advancement to Group I, while the bottom team faced potential relegation to Group III.

Standings

Round-robin

Estonia vs. Tunisia

Finland vs. Latvia

Estonia vs. Latvia

Finland vs. Tunisia

Estonia vs. Finland

Latvia vs. Tunisia

References

External links 
 Fed Cup website

2013 Fed Cup Europe/Africa Zone